Fabrizio Gabriele (born 11 May 1985 in Naples) is an Italian rower. He won two gold medals at the World Rowing Championships.

External links 
 

1985 births
Living people
Italian male rowers
Rowers from Naples
World Rowing Championships medalists for Italy